Il Divo is a multinational operatic pop vocal group.  

Il Divo may also refer to:
 Il Divo (album), a 2004 self-titled album by Il Divo
 Il divo (film), a 2008 Italian film